Andreas Gretschnig (born 16 December 1960) is an Austrian footballer. He played in two matches for the Austria national football team from 1984 to 1986.

References

External links
 

1960 births
Living people
Austrian footballers
Austria international footballers
Place of birth missing (living people)
Association footballers not categorized by position